Perdita  is an inner satellite of Uranus. Perdita's discovery was complicated. The first photographs of Perdita were taken by the Voyager 2 spacecraft in 1986, but it was not recognized from the photographs for more than a decade. In 1999, the moon was noticed by Erich Karkoschka and reported. But because no further pictures could be taken to confirm its existence, it was officially demoted in 2001. However, in 2003, pictures taken by the Hubble Space Telescope managed to pick up an object where Perdita was supposed to be, finally confirming its existence.

Following its discovery in 1999, it was given the temporary designation of S/1986 U 10. It was named Perdita (Latin for 'lost') after the daughter of Leontes and Hermione in William Shakespeare's play The Winter's Tale. The moon is also designated Uranus XXV.

The moon orbits between Belinda and Puck. The above-mentioned Hubble measurements prove that Perdita does not follow a direct Keplerian motion around Uranus. Instead, it is clearly caught in a 43:44 orbital resonance with the nearby moon Belinda. It is also close to an 8:7 resonance with Rosalind.

Perdita belongs to the Portia group of satellites, which also includes Bianca, Cressida, Desdemona, Portia, Juliet, Cupid, Rosalind and Belinda. These satellites have similar orbits and photometric properties. Little is known about Perdita apart from its orbit, radius of  15 km and geometric albedo of 0.08.

See also 

 Moons of Uranus

References 

Explanatory notes

Citations

Sources

External links 
 Uranus 'Loses' a Moon: The 'New' Official Moon Count of the Solar System (Archived), Melanie Melton, The Planetary Society, 20 December 2001

Moons of Uranus
19990518
Moons with a prograde orbit